Paweł Janusz Poncyljusz (born 18 May 1969 in Warsaw) is a Polish politician. He was elected to the Sejm on 25 September 2005, getting 4232 votes in Warsaw I as a candidate on the Law and Justice list. In November 2010, he moved to the new party Poland Comes First.

He was also a member of Sejm 2001-2005.

Education
He is a graduate of the Karol Świerczewski Liceum in Warsaw.

Private life
Married to Edyta (since 1995). The couple has four children: Julia, Zuzanna, Kacper, Łukasz.

See also
Members of Polish Sejm 2005-2007

References

External links
Paweł Poncyljusz - parliamentary page - includes declarations of interest, voting record, and transcripts of speeches.

1969 births
Living people
Politicians from Warsaw
Poland Comes First politicians
Law and Justice politicians
Members of the Polish Sejm 2001–2005
Members of the Polish Sejm 2005–2007
Members of the Polish Sejm 2007–2011
Members of the Polish Sejm 2019–2023